The 1973 NCAA University Division Tennis Championships were the 28th annual tournaments to determine the national champions of NCAA University Division men's singles, doubles, and team collegiate tennis in the United States. This was the final year before the NCAA changed the name of its University Division to its present-day moniker, Division I.

Stanford, the previous year's runners-up, captured the team championship, the Indians' first such title. Stanford finished five points ahead of USC in the final team standings (33–28).

Host site
This year's tournaments were contested at the Lenz Tennis Center at Princeton University in Princeton, New Jersey.

Team scoring
Until 1977, the men's team championship was determined by points awarded based on individual performances in the singles and doubles events.

References

External links
List of NCAA Men's Tennis Champions

NCAA Division I tennis championships
NCAA Division I Tennis Championships
NCAA Division I Tennis Championships
NCAA University Division Tennis Championships